The Pixel Tablet is an Android tablet designed, developed, and marketed by Google as part of the Google Pixel product line. It was previewed at the 2022 Google I/O keynote in May 2022, and will be released in 2023.

History 
In June 2019, Google told Business Insider and Computerworld that its hardware division would no longer develop tablets, following the lackluster reception to the ChromeOS-powered Pixel Slate tablet introduced the previous year. Production was halted on a successor to the Pixel Slate as well as two unnannounced tablets, with the company refocusing their attention on the Pixelbook laptop series. In March 2022, 9to5Google reported that the company was developing a Google Assistant-powered smart display similar to the Nest Hub with a detachable tablet-style screen. On May 11, during the 2022 Google I/O keynote, Google unveiled a preview at an upcoming Pixel-branded Android tablet powered by the Google Tensor system-on-chip (SoC), to be released the following year. The tablet was certified by the Universal Stylus Initiative later that month, indicating support for stylus pens. Google officially announced the Pixel Tablet at the 2022 Made by Google event on October 6.

Specifications

Design 
Google shared a very brief look of the Pixel tablet at the Google I/O 2022 event. The video presents the device's soft, rounded design, including what appears to be a backing made of matte, soft rubber. In addition, the Pixel Tablet has two cameras – one at the front, and one at the back of the device. It also features two speakers on its right edge and a power button just above the back camera, in the top right corner of the body. Google also mentioned that the Pixel Tablet has a body made out of 100 % recycled aluminum and features a nano-ceramic coating.

Hardware 
It was revealed at the October 6 Pixel event that the Pixel tablet will feature the second gen Tensor processor, as well as a Nest Hub-like dock accessory.

Software

Marketing

Reception 
After Google announced it had abandoned plans on developing further tablets, Dieter Bohn of The Verge criticized Google's "institutional neglect of Android and ChromeOS on tablets", noting that Google's many tablet efforts had failed simply because they had not been a priority for the company and opining that it would be difficult for Google to "catch up" with Apple's iPad Pro. Following the announcement of the Pixel tablet and Pixel Watch at the 2022 Google I/O, The Verge Jon Porter opined that Google was taking a subtle approach at Apple's "walled garden" ecosystem strategy, with his colleague Dan Seifert found the tablet's design unattractive and cheap-looking. J. R. Raphael conceded that the tablet did not radiate a "premium" appearance, but speculated that the tablet was more akin to a smart display and concluded that Google may not be seeking to compete with the iPad.

References 

Android (operating system) devices
Computer-related introductions in 2022
Google hardware
Google Pixel
Tablet computers introduced in 2022